Zebinidae is a family of small sea snails in the clade Littorinimorpha.

Genera
Genera within the family Zebinidae include:
 Cossmannia Newton, 1891†
 Folinia Crosse, 1868
 Lapsigyrus Berry, 1958
 Microstelma A. Adams, 1863
 Mirarissoina Woodring, 1928
 Pandalosia Laseron, 1956
 Pseudotaphrus Cossmann, 1888†
 Schwartziella G. Nevill, 1885
 Takirissoina Oyama, 1962
 Tomlinella Viader, 1938
 Zebina H. Adams & A. Adams, 1854
Subfamily Stosiciinae Faber & Gori, 2016
 Bittinella Dall, 1924
 Isseliella Weinkauff, 1881
 Stosicia Brusina, 1871

References

  Criscione, F., Ponder, W. F., Köhler, F., Takano, T. & Kano, Y. (2017) A molecular phylogeny of Rissoidae (Caenogastropoda: Rissooidea) allows testing the diagnostic utility of morphological traits Zoological Journal of the Linnean Society. 179: 23–40

 
Gastropod families